This list seeks to compile the list of individuals and non government organizations (NGOs) implicated to the Priority Development Assistance Fund scam, otherwise known as the pork barrel scam.

Implicated individuals

Implicated organizations

JLN Corporation - company of Janet Lim-Napoles.
Agri and Economic Program for Farmers Foundation, Inc. (AEPFFI)
Agricultura Para sa Magbubukid Foundation (APMFI)
Countrywide Agri and Rural Economic Development (CARED) Foundation
Masaganang Ani Para sa Magsasaka Foundation, Inc (MAMFI)
People's Organization for Progress and Development Foundation (POPDFI)
Philippine Agri and Social Development Foundation Inc.
Philippine Social Development Foundation, Inc. (PSDFI)
Social Development Program for Farmers Foundation, Inc. (SDPFFI)

References

Political scandals in the Philippines
Political corruption in the Philippines